WEGA is a German audio and video manufacturer, manufacturing some of Germany's earliest radio receivers.

History
WEGA, pronounced "Vega", was founded as Wuerttembergische Radio-Gesellschaft mbh in Stuttgart, Germany in the year 1923. In 1975, it was acquired by Sony Corporation. They were then known throughout Europe for stylish and high-quality stereo equipment, designed by Verner Panton and Hartmut Esslinger. Sony continued to use the WEGA brand until 2005, when liquid-crystal displays superseded the company's Trinitron aperture grille-based CRT models.

Starting in 1998, Sony released a television line called FD Trinitron/WEGA, a flat-screen television with side-mounted speakers and a silver-coloured cabinet.

Sony says that the FD Trinitron WEGA was named after a star ("Vega" in English) in the Lyra constellation, and made no reference to the original WEGA firm.

Sony has also used WEGA as a name for flat-screen televisions with newer technologies than CRT. Their flat-panel LCD televisions were branded LCD WEGA until summer 2005 when they were rebranded BRAVIA. There are early promotional photos of the first BRAVIA televisions still bearing the WEGA label. Introduced in 2002, Sony's plasma display televisions were also branded as Plasma WEGA until being superseded by the BRAVIA LCD line. Sony's rear-projection televisions, either Silicon X-tal Reflective Display (SXRD) or LCD-based, were branded as Grand WEGA until Sony discontinued production of rear-projection receivers.

Importance
The quality of the design by Esslinger was highly appreciated, to the extent that the Museum of Modern Art in New York exhibits one example, the Concept 51k sound-system, for which a special stand was an available option.

In 1980 Sony used half of the production in Stuttgart for its Trinitron televisions.

References

External links 
 WEGA at radiomuseum.org (German)

Sony products
German brands
Electronics companies of Germany
Manufacturing companies based in Stuttgart
Manufacturing companies established in 1923
German companies established in 1923
1975 mergers and acquisitions
Manufacturing companies disestablished in 2005